Vincent Hanly (22 April 1899 – 9 November 1970) was an Irish Roman Catholic clergyman who served as the Bishop of Elphin from 1950 to 1970.

He studied for the priesthood at Maynooth College and was ordained a priest for service in the Diocese of Elphin on 17 June 1923 and continued his studies at the college for two further years to gain an STL.  In 1925 joined the teaching staff of Summerhill College but very soon was appointed to Sligo parish as a curate and secretary to his predecessor Bishop Doorly. In 1930 he returned to Summerhill College as Professor of Mathematics and Latin.

He became Vice-President of the College in 1939 and Chancellor of the diocese, transferring five years later to serve as Administrator of Sligo Cathedral.   He was responsible for the introduction of the Legion of Mary into Sligo.

He attended all four sessions of the Second Vatican Council

He is one of the founders of St. Aloysius College.

References

1899 births
1970 deaths
Alumni of St Patrick's College, Maynooth
Roman Catholic bishops of Elphin
20th-century Roman Catholic archbishops in Ireland